This is a list of singles that reached number one on the Cash Box Top 100 Singles chart in 1984, present in chronological order.

See also
1984 in music
List of Hot 100 number-one singles of 1984 (U.S.)

References

http://members.aol.com/_ht_a/randypny3/cashbox/1984.html
https://web.archive.org/web/20060614052203/http://musicseek.info/no1hits/1984.htm

1984
1984 record charts
1984 in American music